The 2015 Kazakhstan Premier League is the 24th season of the Kazakhstan Premier League, the highest football league competition in Kazakhstan. The season began in March 2015 and finished in November. Astana were the defending champions having won their first league championship the previous year.

Teams
Spartak Semey was relegated at the end of the 2014 season, and were replaced by Okzhetpes.

Team overview

Personnel and kits

Note: Flags indicate national team as has been defined under FIFA eligibility rules. Players and Managers may hold more than one non-FIFA nationality.

Foreign players
The number of foreign players is restricted to eight per KPL team. A team can use only five foreign players on the field in each game.

In bold: Players that have been capped for their national team.

Managerial changes

Regular season
In the regular season twelve teams played each other home-and-away in a round-robin format for a total of 22 matches per team. The top six teams advanced to the Championship round and the bottom six teams qualified for the Relegation round.

Regular season table

Regular season results

Championship round
The top six teams from Regular season will participate in the Championship round where they will play each other home-and-away in a round-robin format for a total of 10 matches per team. They will start this round with their points from Regular season halved, rounded upwards, and they will keep their Regular season record (matches won, draws, losses and goal differential). After completion of the Championship round the winners will be the Champions of 2015 Kazakhstan Premier League and qualify for 2016–17 UEFA Champions League second qualifying round. The runners-up and third-placed team will qualify for Europa League first qualifying round and the fourth placed team may also qualify for Europa League if they or one of the top three teams wins the 2015 Kazakhstan Cup.

Championship round table

Championship round results

Relegation round
The bottom six teams from Regular season will participate in the Relegation round where they will play each other home-and-away in a round-robin format for a total of 10 matches per team. They will start this round with their points from Regular season halved, rounded upwards, and they will keep their Regular season record (matches won, draws, losses and goal differential). After completion of the Relegation round the winners will be considered 7th-placed team of 2015 Kazakhstan Premier League, the runners-up will be 8th and so on, with the last team being 12th. The 11th-placed team will qualify for Relegation play-off against runners-up of 2015 Kazakhstan First Division, with the loser being eliminated, and the 12th-placed team will be directly relegated to 2016 Kazakhstan First Division as the last-placed team.

Relegation round table

Relegation round results

Relegation play-offs

Statistics

Top scorers

Hat-tricks

Scoring
 First goal of the season: Ivan Božić for Ordabasy against Irtysh (7 March 2015)
 Fastest goal of the season: 2nd minute, 
Grigori Sartakov for Irtysh against Tobol (21 March 2015)
 Latest goal of the season: 94th minute, 
Gerard Gohou for Kairat against Tobol (7 March 2015)

References

Kazakhstan Premier League seasons
1
Kazakh
Kazakh